The 1939 College Football All-America team is composed of college football players who were selected as All-Americans by various organizations and writers that chose College Football All-America Teams in 1939. The nine selectors recognized by the NCAA as "official" for the 1939 season are (1) Collier's Weekly, as selected by Grantland Rice, (2) the Associated Press, (3) the United Press, (4) the All-America Board, (5) the International News Service (INS), (6) Liberty magazine, (7) the Newspaper Enterprise Association (NEA), (8) Newsweek, and (9) the Sporting News.

Two players, USC guard Harry Smith and Cornell tackle Nick Drahos, were unanimously chosen by all nine official selectors. Two other players, Iowa halfback Nile Kinnick and Michigan halfback Tom Harmon were selected as first-team All-Americans by eight of the nine official selectors, with Kinnick winning the Heisman Trophy in 1939 and Harmon winning it in 1940.

Consensus All-Americans
For the year 1939, the NCAA recognizes nine published All-American teams as "official" designations for purposes of its consensus determinations. The following chart identifies the NCAA-recognized consensus All-Americans and displays which first-team designations they received.

All-American selections for 1939

Ends
Esco Sarkkinen, Ohio State (AAB; AP-2; CO-1; NEA-1; NW-1; UP-1; CP-1; NYS-1; WC-1)
Ken Kavanaugh, LSU (College Football Hall of Fame) (AP-2; INS-1; NW-1; LIB; SN; UP-1; BL; CP-2; CW-1; LIFE-1)
Bud Kerr, Notre Dame (AAB; AP-1; INS-2; NEA-1; SN; UP-2; BL; CP-2; CW-1; LIFE-1; NYS-2; WC-1)
Ralph Wenzel, Tulane (UP-3; CP-1; CW-2; LIFE-2; NYS-1)
Paul Severin, North Carolina (AP-1; UP-3; NEA-2)
Harlan Gustafson, Penn (AP-3; INS-1; CW-2; LIFE-2)
Pop Ivy, Oklahoma (AP-3; CO-1)
Dave Rankin, Purdue (LIB)
Erwin Prasse, Iowa (UP-2; CP-3)
Bob Ison, Georgia Tech (CP-3; NEA-3; NYS-2)
Bob Nowaskey, George Washington (NEA-3)
Hal Newman, Alabama (NEA-2)
Bill Anahu, Santa Clara (INS-2)

Tackles
Nick Drahos, Cornell (College Football Hall of Fame) (AAB; AP-1; CO-1; INS-1; LIB; NEA-1; NW-1; SN; UP-1; CP-1; CW-1; LIFE-1; WC-1)
Harley McCollum, Tulane (AP-1; INS-2; NEA-1; LIB; CP-3)
Harry Stella, Army (AP-2; INS-1; NW-1; UP-1; CW-2; LIFE-2)
Joe Boyd, Texas A&M (AP-3; CO-1; NEA-2; SN; UP-2; BL; CP-2; CW-1; LIFE-2; NYS-1)
Cliff Duggan, Oklahoma (INS-2; NEA-3; UP-2; BL; CP-1; LIFE-1; CW-2; NYS-1)
Lee Artoe, California (AP-2)
Ty Coon, North Carolina State (NEA-2; NYS-2)
Win Pedersen, Minnesota (AP-3; UP-3)
Mike Enich, Iowa (NEA-3)
Phil Gaspar, USC (UP-3)
Bob Tierney, Princeton (CP-2)
Jim Reeder, Illinois (AAB; NYS-2; WC-1)

Guards
Harry Smith, USC (College Football Hall of Fame) (AAB; AP-1; CO-1; INS-1; LIB; NEA-1; NW-1; SN; UP-1; BL; CP-1; CW-1; LIFE-1; NYS-1; WC-1)
Ed Molinski, Tennessee (College Football Hall of Fame) (AAB; AP-1; CO-1; LIB; NEA-1; UP-2; CP-3; WC-1)
Bob Suffridge, Tennessee (College Football Hall of Fame) (INS-1; NEA-3; NW-1; SN; UP-1; BL; CP-1; CW-1; LIFE-1; NYS-1)
Marshall Robnett, Texas A&M (AP-2; UP-3)
Jim Turner, Holy Cross (UP-3; CP-2; INS-2; NYS-2)
Elbie Schultz, Oregon State (AP-3; CP-3; CW-2; LIFE-2; NYS-2)
Allen Johnson, Duke (INS-2; CW-2; LIFE-2)
Mel Brewer, Illinois (UP-2)
Warren Alfson, Nebraska (AP-2)
Bob Waldorf, Missouri (NEA-2)
Tommy O'Boyle, Tulane (NEA-2)
Jack Sommers, UCLA (CP-2)
Frank Ribar, Duke (AP-3)
Joseph Enzler, Portland (NEA-3)
Carl Nery, Duquesne (CP-3)

Centers
John Schiechl, Santa Clara (AAB; AP-1; UP-2; CO-1; CP-1; INS-2; NEA-1; NYS-2; WC-1)
Jack Haman, Northwestern (INS-1; NW-1; SN; UP-1; BL; CP-3; CW-1; LIFE-2)
Cary Cox, Alabama (CP-2; LIB)
Archie Kodros, Michigan (UP-3; CW-2; LIFE-1)
Bulldog Turner, Hardin-Simmons (NEA-3; NYS-1)
Frank Finneran, Cornell (AP-3; NEA-2)
Robert Nelson, Baylor (AP-2)

Quarterbacks
George Cafego, Tennessee (INS-1; AP-2; NEA-2 [fb]; NW-1; SN; UP-1; CP-2; CW-1; LIFE-1)
Paul Christman, Missouri (AAB; AP-2; CO-1; CP-2; INS-2; NEA-1; SN; UP-2; CW-1; NYS-2; WC-1)
Jimmy McFadden, Clemson (AP-1)
Walter Matuszczak, Cornell (NYS-1)
Don Scott, Ohio State (AP-3; UP-3; CP-3; NEA-2; LIB)
Snuffy Stirnweiss, North Carolina (CP-2; NEA-3)

Halfbacks
Tom Harmon, Michigan (College Football Hall of Fame) (AAB; AP-1; UP-1; CO-1; CINS-1; NEA-3; NW-1; LIB; SN; BL; CP-1; CW-1; LIFE-1; NYS-1 [fb]; WC-1)
Nile Kinnick, Iowa (College Football Hall of Fame) (AAB; AP-1; UP-1; CO-1; INS-1; NEA-1; NW-1; SN; BL; CP-1; CW-1; LIFE-2; NYS-1; WC-1)
Banks McFadden, Clemson (College Football Hall of Fame) (UP-3; CO-1 [fb]; CP-3; NEA-1)
George McAfee, Duke (College and Pro Football Hall of Fame) (AP-2; UP-2; CP-2; NEA-2; NYS-1; BL; LIFE-2)
Kenny Washington, UCLA (College Football Hall of Fame) (AP-2; UP-2; CP-3; INS-2; NEA-2; CW-2; NYS-2; LIB; LIFE-1)
Grenny Lansdell, USC (AP-3; CP-1; CW-2)
Dick Cassiano, Pitt (NEA-3; UP-3; CW-2; LIFE-2)
Jim Lelanne, North Carolina (INS-2; LIFE-2)
Beryl Clark, Oklahoma (INS-2)
Robert Hoffman, USC (NYS-2)
Jack Crain, Texas (AP-3)

Fullbacks
John Kimbrough, Texas A&M (College Football Hall of Fame) (AAB; AP-1; INS-1; NEA-1; NW-1; LIB; UP-1; BL; CP-1; CW-2; LIFE-1; NYS-2; WC-1)
Milt Piepul, Notre Dame (UP-2)
Dom Principe, Fordham (AP-3; UP-3; CP-3; NEA-3)

Key
Bold = Consensus All-American
 -1 – First-team selection
 -2 – Second-team selection
 -3 – Third-team selection

Official selectors
 AAB = All-America Board
 AP = Associated Press
 CO = Collier's Weekly, selected by Grantland Rice
 INS = International News Service
 LIB = Liberty magazine
 NEA = Newspaper Enterprise Association
 NW = Newsweek, based on a consensus of five All-America teams chosen by the UP, the New York Daily News, Christy Walsh All-America Football Board, and the New York Sun
 SN = The Sporting News
 UP = United Press

Other selectors
 BL = Boys' Life, All-America, All-Scout team.
 CP = Central Press Association, selected by the captains of more than 60 football teams across the country
 CW = Collegiate Writers: selected by a national poll of 67 collegiate sports writers in 36 states
 LIFE = Life magazine selected by NBC announcer Bill Stern
 NYS = New York Sun
 WC = Walter Camp Football Foundation

See also
 1939 All-Big Six Conference football team
 1939 All-Big Ten Conference football team
 1939 All-Pacific Coast Conference football team
 1939 All-SEC football team
 1939 All-Southwest Conference football team

References

All-America Team
College Football All-America Teams